Silver Run Falls is a 20-foot waterfall a few miles from the town of Cashiers, North Carolina. It is popular with locals and tourists alike. The falls are located after a flat, 200 yard trail. Additionally, there is a second secret falls located above Silver Run. On the left side of the cliff face of the falls, just inside the woods, there is a slope of granite with many roots for handholds leading to the top of the falls. Follow the trail up top until you hear the second falls on your right.

References 

Waterfalls of North Carolina
Nantahala National Forest
Protected areas of Jackson County, North Carolina
Landforms of Jackson County, North Carolina